El emigrante (meaning The Emigrant) is a 1960 Spanish comedy film directed by Sebastián Almeida, and starring Juanito Valderrama, Julio Núñez and Silvia Solar. The film is set in the Carnival of Cádiz. It was shot in Cádiz. The film was released on 12 December 1960.

Cast
Juanito Valderrama	
Julio Núñez		
Silvia Solar	
Dolores Abril		
Francisco Piquer		
Rogelio Madrid		
José Marco		
Emilio Fábregas		
José María Caffarel		
Marta Flores		
Julio Gallego		
Ángela Liaño		
Jesús Puche

References

External links
 

1960 films
1960s Spanish-language films
1960 comedy films
Spanish black-and-white films
Cádiz in fiction
Films shot in the province of Cádiz
Films set in Andalusia
1960s Spanish films